The Albanian Urban Lyric Song is a musical tradition of Albania that  started in the 18th century and culminated in the 1930s.

References

Sources

Albanian styles of music